Frank Herbert Burnside (August 7, 1888 - August 26, 1935) was a record-holding pioneer airmail pilot.

Biography
Frank Herbert Burnside was born on August 7, 1888 in Oneonta, New York. He originally studied to be a musician, but learned to fly in 1911. In 1913 he set the American flight altitude record at 12,950 feet in Bath, New York besting the record set by Lincoln Beachey in Chicago in 1911.

Burnside retired from flying in 1931 and he died on August 26, 1935 in Bath, New York.

Aviation records
 American flight altitude record of 12,950 feet in Bath, New York (1913). 
 American air speed record of 95.0 and 97.4 mph (1916).
 American (and possibly world) air speed record of 163.68 mph (1919).

External links
 Frank Herbert Burnside at the Hall of Fame for Steuben County, New York 
 
 Frank Herbert Burnside at Early Aviators

References

1888 births
1935 deaths
Members of the Early Birds of Aviation
People from Oneonta, New York
United States airmail pilots
American aviation record holders